Mount Druitt Waterworks was a water park in Mount Druitt, New South Wales, Australia.  It was opened in 1981 and initially was very successful, however in later years costly upgrades and declining sales forced the park to close in 1994. It was operated jointly with the Manly Waterworks (1981) which remains open, and Cairns Waterworks (1980). It was located at Stout Road, Mount Druitt, near the foot bridge on the northern side of the railway lines.

During the 1980s the television slogan was "the Waterworks will get you in the mood".

Attractions
Six Waterslides
A 'beach' pool
Bumper boats, later replaced by Go-Karts
White water rapids
The "Sky Dive" slippery dip (opened in 1988)

See also
Manly Waterworks

References

Defunct amusement parks in Australia
Water parks in New South Wales
1981 establishments in Australia
1994 disestablishments in Australia
Mount Druitt